Palnati Puli is a 1984 Indian Telugu-language action film, produced by Gogineni Prasad under the Sai Chakra Productions banner and directed by Tatineni Prasad. It stars Nandamuri Balakrishna, Bhanupriya  and music composed by Chakravarthy.

Plot
The film begins in a town where two spurious, Mukundam an advocate, and his brother-in-law Bhupati undertake the malfeasance as wise. Raju is a rickshaw driver and a labor union leader who is endeared by his entire colony. He always antagonizes the misdeeds of Mukundam & Bhupati and also squabbles with Rani daughter of Bhupati. But later, they fall in love. Being cognizant of it, Bhupati checks Raju's record. Whereby, he identifies him as the son of Parvati wife of their henchman Kannaiah who is presently in prison. Hence, the malefactor's subterfuge, acquit Kannaiah when he assaults Parvati and sullies her chastity. Since Raju is born in his absence Parvati also confirms this as a fact. Knowing it, Raju breaks down. After a while, on the goading of Mukundam, Kannaiah onslaughts Raju in which Parvati is injured.

Soon after the recovery, Raju insists on her for reality then she spins rearward which makes Raju shocked to learn Parvati is his foster. His true mother is Sarada a woman entrapped by Mukundam and sought to kill her when his need is met. However, she survived and accredited Raju's responsibility to Parvati. Now, Raju is blind as an owl to see the spoiled face of his mother and is infuriated with vengeance. So, he turns valiant Palnati Puli mocks and creates hurdles to the knaves with the help of Rani. Moreover, Raju reforms Kannaiah too. In tandem, Mukundam is aware of the actuality, complots, and puts fire to Raju's colony which leaves several deaths. Thus, Raju outbursts at Mukundam and on the verge to kill Sarada rescues him. At last, Mukundam realizes his mistake, pleads pardon, and accepts Raju as his son. Finally, the movie ends on a happy note with the marriage of Raju and Rani.

Cast 
Nandamuri Balakrishna as Raju
Bhanupriya as Rani
Satyanarayana as Bhupathi
Jaggayya as Lawyer Mukundam
Gokkina Rama Rao as Kannayya
Mada as Kondandam
Bhimaraju as Gangulu
Jaya Malini as item number
Shyamala Gowri as Gowri
Prameela as Parvathi
Anitha as Sharada
Bindu Madhavi as Saroja

Soundtrack 

Music was composed by Chakravarthy, and lyrics were written by Veturi. Music was released by AVM Audio Company.

References

External links 

1984 films
1980s Telugu-language films
Films scored by K. Chakravarthy
Films directed by T. L. V. Prasad